Cody Daniel Johnson (born May 21, 1987) is an American country music singer-songwriter. He self-released six albums, including Gotta Be Me, which debuted at number two on Billboards Country Albums chart, before releasing his first major-label album, Ain't Nothin' to It, in January 2019. He released his second major-label album, Human: The Double Album, in October 2021. Johnson's style is classified as contemporary country, neo-traditionalist country, or Cowboy. Also, he is influenced by country artists such as George Strait and Willie Nelson among others. He has won several awards such as "Single of the Year" and Music Video of the Year" for his song "Til You Can't" at the Country Music Association.

Early life 
Cody Daniel Johnson, also known as "CoJo," was born and raised in Sebastopol, Texas, by his parents, Sheila and Carl Johnson. Johnson began playing music at age 12. Johnson started learning music from his father at the age of 12. His father, Carl, performed in their local church where Cody learned to sing and play several instruments. Also, learning music taught him how to read and understand music. He started to play at school and bars, where he discovered that people enjoyed his music. At the same time, he rode bulls professionally at local rodeos and even worked alongside his father within the local prison system. At the age of 19, the prison warden eventually convinced Cody to commit to his music career full time.

Career
In 2006, he formed the Cody Johnson Band with his dad, Carl, and drummer Nathan Reedy. Together they recorded an album, Black and White Label. In 2006, the band added a lead guitar player, Matt Rogers, and recorded a live album, Live and Rocking, at Shenanigans and Confetti's Club in Huntsville. Following the release of the album, Johnson's father quit the band.

By 2009, Danny Salinas joined the band on bass guitar. Their first professionally produced album, Six Strings One Dream, was released in September 2009. Three singles from the album reached the top 10 of the Texas music charts. Following the release of the album, the band added Chris Whitten on fiddle and Jeff Smith on lead guitar. Jody Bartula replaced Whitten on fiddle in 2010.

Johnson's next album, A Different Day, was released in 2011 and produced by Trent Willmon. Johnson won the 2011 Texas Regional Music Award for New Male Vocalist of the Year. After the win, Johnson left his day job with the Texas Department of Criminal Justice to focus on music full-time. He teamed with Kyle Park in 2012 for the Dancin' and Drinkin' at Johnson Park Tour. Also in 2012, Johnson's band, now composed of Reedy, Smith, Bartula, and bassist Joey Pruski, changed their name to the Rockin' CJB's.

Johnson's fifth album, Cowboy Like Me, was released on January 14, 2014. The album was Johnson's second produced by Trent Willmon. It sold 8,000 copies in its first week of release, debuting at number 25 on the Billboard Top Country Albums chart and number 33 on the Billboard 200. As of 2014, Johnson's band comprised Smith, Bartula, Pruski, and drummer Miles Stone.

The sixth album, Gotta Be Me, was released on August 5, 2016. The album debuted at No. 11 on the Billboard 200, and at No. 2 on the Top Country Albums chart, selling 23,000 copies in the US in its first week. It was Johnson's most successful release yet, achieved without major label support or widespread radio play.

Johnson made Houston Livestock Show and Rodeo history by becoming the first unsigned/independent artist to play to a sold-out crowd on March 12, 2018.

Johnson's seventh album, Ain't Nothin' to It, was released on January 18, 2019. It includes the single "On My Way to You", which is his first Top 40 hit on Country Airplay. The album and single were both released via Warner Bros. Records Nashville. In 2019, Johnson collaborated with Brooks & Dunn on a new version of their hit song "Red Dirt Road" which appears on their album Reboot.

Johnson's eighth album, Human: The Double Album, released in October 2021.

Artistry

Musical style 
Cody Johnson’s music is classified as contemporary country, neo-traditionalist country, or Cowboy. Marcus Dowling of CMT has stated that many view Johnson as a leader within the “back to country” movement in the industry. In an interview with Brett Callwood, Johnson has described his music as drawing on multiple genres: “I’m not sure if you’d call me Texas or red dirt or mainstream or outlaw. I just always say that I’m me. I sound like what I sound like, and I’m not trying to be anything that I’m not.” Johnson plays a multitude of genres in order to create his own sound as he talks of here.

Influences 
Johnson is inspired by many artists George Strait, Willie Nelson, Merle Haggard, Hank Williams, and Loretta Lynn, who are considered to be from the traditional days of country music. In an interview with Andy Langer and Texas Monthly in 2019, he has stated that he is inspired by two artists in particular: “The George Strait type of traditional country music is what I like, and that’s what I stand for. But at the same time, Willie Nelson’s unwillingness to waver on who he is means just as much.” Johnson takes inspiration from his country background of bull riding and working within the prison system, which he has said has influenced his songs such as “Guilty as Can Be”. In an interview with Brett Callwood at Westword, Johnson spoke on the influence of previous job experiences: “It [“Guilty as Can Be”] was a made-up story about a guy who catches his wife cheating, goes to prison and the whole nine yards. I paid homage to my prison years there.” Additionally, his life experiences of almost being in a plane crash influenced “Til You Can’t” and his barroom brawls influenced the song “Billy’s Brother”.

Discography

Albums

Singles

Other charted and certified songs

Music videos

Awards and nominations

Awards
Country Music Association
 2022 Single of the Year - "'Til You Can't"
 2022 Music Video of the Year - "'Til You Can't"

Nominations
Country Music Association
 2019 New Artist of the Year
 2022 Male Vocalist of the Year
 2022 New Artist of the Year

Academy of Country Music
 2020 New Male Artist of the Year

References

External links

1987 births
American country singer-songwriters
American male singer-songwriters
Country musicians from Texas
Living people
People from Huntsville, Texas
Singer-songwriters from Texas
People from Trinity County, Texas
21st-century American singers
21st-century American male singers
Warner Records artists